The Tennessee Supreme Court Building in Nashville, Tennessee, is the historic building that houses the Tennessee Supreme Court offices and where the court meets when it is in session in Nashville. It was listed on the National Register of Historic Places in 2014.

History
The building, across from the Tennessee State Capitol at the corner of Charlotte Avenue and 7th Avenue North, was completed in 1937. Before its construction, the Supreme Court had occupied space in the Capitol.

The four-story building was designed by Nashville architects Marr & Holman in a style known as Stripped Classicism. It was built by Rock City Construction Company. It was listed on the National Register of Historic Places on March 18, 2014.

Parts of three films were shot in the court building: Marie in 1984, Last Dance in 1995, and Billy: The Early Years in 2008.

Other Tennessee Supreme Court buildings
Other Tennessee Supreme Court buildings are located in Jackson and Knoxville. The Supreme Court building in Knoxville is also listed on the National Register.

References

External links
 Tennessee Supreme Court
 Nashville Supreme Court Building Virtual Tour, Tennessee Administrative Office of the Courts

Buildings and structures in Nashville, Tennessee
Government buildings on the National Register of Historic Places in Tennessee
Building
Stripped Classical architecture in the United States
National Register of Historic Places in Nashville, Tennessee